Brian E. "Pat" O'Connell (born 13 September 1937) is an English former footballer who played as a half back or winger. He started his career as a junior at Fulham, for whom he made his professional debut in 1958. He spent eight years at Fulham, playing 156 league matches and scoring 26 goals. He moved to Crystal Palace in 1966, where he played for a single season, making 21 appearances in the league and scoring 2 goals. In 1968, he moved to Canada to play for Vancouver Royals.

After his playing career he went on to manage Epsom & Ewell from 1973 until 1982. During his time there he went on to win the Surrey Senior League, division two of the Isthmian League and took the club to the first final of the FA Vase.

References

External links
O'Connell at holmesdale.net
Where are they now (O'Connell profile at fulhamfc.com)

1937 births
Footballers from Kensington
Association football wingers
Crystal Palace F.C. players
Fulham F.C. players
Vancouver Royals players
Living people
Brentwood Town F.C. players
English expatriate footballers
English footballers
English Football League players
Expatriate soccer players in Canada
North American Soccer League (1968–1984) players
English football managers
Epsom & Ewell F.C. managers
English expatriate sportspeople in Canada